Dylan Alcott and Andrew Lapthorne defeated Koji Sugeno and David Wagner in the final, 6−2, 7−6(7−4) to win the inaugural quad doubles wheelchair tennis title at the 2019 Wimbledon Championships. It was the third step towards an eventual Grand Slam for Alcott.

Lapthorne and Wagner were the defending champions from when the tournament was held as an exhibition the previous year, but chose not to participate together.

Seeds

Draw

References

External links
 Main Draw

2019 Wimbledon Championships
Wimbledon Championships, 2019 Quad Doubles